In Australia, state and territory colours are frequently part of a state or territory's set of state symbols.

Some states have formally adopted a set of colours as their official "state colours" while others have de facto state colours that have become well-known through popular use. State colours often appear on a variety of different media, from the state's flag to the colours used in sports. In particular the Sheffield Shield team caps popularised the usage of single colours to represent each state. The colours of state schools have been synonymous with states, whereby you find Queensland Public Schools are primarily Maroon, New South Wales Public Schools are primarily Sky Blue, and Western Australian Public Schools are Bottle Green. This does not come without exception however.

See also

National colours of Australia
List of symbols of states and territories of Australia
State of Origin
Interstate matches in Australian rules football

References

National colours
Flags of Australia